Vitis rotundifolia, or muscadine, is a grapevine species native to the southeastern and south-central United States. The growth range extends from Florida to New Jersey coast, and west to eastern Texas and Oklahoma. It has been extensively cultivated since the 16th century. The plants are well-adapted to their native warm and humid climate; they need fewer chilling hours than better known varieties, and thrive in summer heat.

Muscadine berries may be bronze or dark purple or black when ripe. Wild varieties may stay green through maturity. Muscadines are typically used in making artisan wines, juice, and jelly. They are rich sources of polyphenols.

In a natural setting, muscadine provides wildlife habitat as shelter, browse, and food for many birds and animals. It is also a larval host for the Nessus Sphinx Moth (Amphion floridensis) and the Mournful Sphinx Moth (Enyo lugubris).

Taxonomy and pathology
Although in the same genus Vitis with the other grapevine species, the muscadine species belongs to a separate subgenus, Muscadinia (all other grapevine species belong to subgenus Euvitis).
Usually the species is divided into three varieties, Vitis rotundifolia Michx. var. rotundifolia (southeast USA), Vitis rotundifolia Michx. var. munsoniana (Florida), and Vitis rotundifolia Michx. var. popenoei (Central America). Some taxonomists have suggested giving the muscadines standing as a genus of its own. It has then also suggested upgrading the varieties to species rank and so splitting two additional species off from Vitis rotundifolia, Vitis munsoniana and Vitis popenoei. All have 40 chromosomes, rather than 38, are generally not cross-compatible with Euvitis subgenus, and most hybrids between the subgenera are sterile. A few are moderately fertile, and have been used in breeding. A commercially available Euvitis × Muscadinia hybrid is the Southern Home cultivar.

Although muscadines are hearty grapes with tough skin that protects them from many plant diseases, these grapes nonetheless appear to be susceptible to parasitic nematodes.

Cultivars

There are about 152 muscadine cultivars grown in the Southern states. These include bronze, black and red varieties and consist of common grapes and patented grapes.

Unlike most cultivated grapevines, many muscadine cultivars are pistillate, requiring a pollenizer to set fruit. A few, such as 'Carlos' and 'Noble', are perfect-flowered, produce fruit with their own pollen, and may also pollinate pistillate cultivars.

Muscadine grape cultivars may have low or inconsistent yields, small berries, flavor and thick skin unsuitable to consumer acceptance, and disease susceptibility. Cultivars tend to be developed either for a limited fresh market or for winemaking. For consumer acceptance, fresh market grapes need to be large, sweet, and with relatively thin skin, whereas those for wine,  juice or jelly need high yields of high-sugar, color-stable berries.

Fresh-market cultivars include Black Beauty, Carlos, Cowart, Flowers, Fry, Granny Val, Ison, James, Jumbo, Magnolia, Memory (first found on T.S. Memory's farm in 1868 in Whiteville, NC), Mish, Nesbitt, Noble, Scuppernong, Summit, Supreme, and Thomas. Produced by the University of Florida, the cultivar, 'Southern Home', contains both subgenera Muscadinia and Euvitis (more precisely, V. rotundifolia × V. vinifera) in its background.

Crops can be started in 3–5 years.  Commercial yields of 20–45 tonnes per hectare (8–18 tons per acre) are possible. Muscadines grow best in fertile sandy loam and alluvial soils. They grow wild in well-drained bottom lands that are not subject to extended drought or waterlogging. They are also resistant to pests and diseases, including Pierce's disease, which can destroy other grape species. Muscadine is one of the grape species most resistant to Phylloxera, an insect that can kill roots of grapevines.

Appellations

Appellations producing Muscadine wines:
 America (Country Appellation)
 Alabama (State Appellation)
 Arkansas (State Appellation)
 Florida (State Appellation)
 Georgia (State Appellation)
 Louisiana (State Appellation)
 Mississippi (State Appellation)
 North Carolina (State Appellation)
 South Carolina (State Appellation)
 Tennessee (State Appellation)
 Texas (State Appellation)

Nutrients
100 grams of muscadine grapes contain the following nutrients according to the USDA:
 Energy: 57 kilocalories
 Fats: 0.47 g
 Carbohydrates: 13.93 g
 Dietary Fiber: 3.9 g
 Protein: 0.81 g
 Calcium: 37 mg
 Phosphorus: 24 mg
 Potassium: 203 mg
 Sodium: 1 mg
 Vitamin C (total ascorbic acid): 6.5 mg
 Riboflavin: 1.5 mg

Consumer research
Consumer research indicates that the thick skins and variable in-season quality of fresh muscadine grapes are significant deterrents to retail acceptance.

Resveratrol and other polyphenols

One report indicated that muscadine grapes contained high concentrations of resveratrol, but subsequent studies have found no or little resveratrol in muscadine grapes.

Other muscadine polyphenols include anthocyanins, tannins, and various flavonoids.

The rank order of total phenolic content among muscadine components was found to be seeds higher than skins higher than leaves higher than pulp.

References

External links

 The Muscadine Experience: Adding Value to Enhance Profits 2004 – 80 page technical resource for growers and processors, University of Arkansas

rotundifolia
Fruits originating in North America
Flora of the North-Central United States
Flora of the Northeastern United States
Flora of the Southeastern United States
Flora of the South-Central United States
Flora of the United States
Flora of the Appalachian Mountains
Red wine grape varieties
Table grape varieties
Crops originating from the United States
Plants described in 1803
American wine
Cuisine of the Southern United States
Plants used in Native American cuisine